Singing Hills Memorial Park is a cemetery dedicated in 1996. It is located on the outskirts of El Cajon, California in the Dehesa Valley.  A  wildlife preserve surrounds the dedicated  of burial, mausoleum and cremation property.

Buried in Singing Hills is professional football player Henry Schmidt (1935–2021).

See also

 List of cemeteries in California
 List of cemeteries in San Diego

External links
 Singing Hills Memorial Park – official site
 
 

Cemeteries in San Diego County, California
Protected areas of San Diego County, California
El Cajon, California